Cuck may refer to:

 Commercial Utility Cargo Vehicle (CUCV)
 Cuck (film), a 2019 American film
 Cucking stool, a chair that was used as punishment in Great Britain
 Cuckold, the husband of an adulterous wife
 Cuckoo, a family of birds
 Cuckquean, the feminine version of a cuckold
 Cuckservative, a political neologism and term of abuse
 Cucq, a community in far northern France

See also
 CUCC (disambiguation)